Golf class can refer to:

 Golf-class submarine
 Golf class car